Heliocheilus cramboides is a moth of the family Noctuidae. It is found in Victoria, Western Australia, the Australian Capital Territory, New South Wales, the Northern Territory, Queensland and South Australia.

Larvae have been recorded on the seedheads of Sorghum intrans .

References

Heliocheilus
Moths of Australia